The University of Denver Ski Team is a collegiate team that has won a record 24 NCAA  Championships the first dating back to 1954. Under the direction of coach Willy Schaeffler, a member of the National Ski Hall of Fame, the Pioneers skied their way to 13 championships. Under Schaeffler's leadership, the University of Denver Ski Team "completely dominated intercollegiate skiing" in the United States for two decades.
  Schaeffler's "passion for preparedness" and tough training regimen yielded "remarkable" success in competition.

The program was absent from 1984–1992, but surged back onto the national scene winning eight of the first 12 NCAA Championships this century. The Alpine team currently practices less than 70 miles away from campus at Winter Park Resort. The Nordic team calls Devil's Thumb Ranch Resort home, only 78 miles from the university.

National championships 

The Pioneers won their 24th team championship in 2018, the most by any ski team in NCAA  history. Colorado is second with 20 titles, and Utah is third with 11. The 24 ski titles are the third most NCAA Division I titles among any team in any single sport. Oklahoma State wrestling holds the most national titles with 34, followed by Southern Cal men’s outdoor track and field (26) and Iowa wrestling (23).

Individual National Champions 
The Pioneers have produced 80 NCAA individual champions, including three in 2011.

Denver Skiing Olympic athletes 

1948 St. Moritz, Switzerland

Donald Johnson (USA)
Alva Hiatt (USA)
Gordon Wren (USA)

1952 Oslo, Norway

Alvin Wegeman (USA)
Keith Wegeman (USA)
Willis Olson (USA)
Theodore Farwell (USA)
Catherine Rudolph (USA)

1956 Cortina, Italy

Marvin Crawford (USA)
Willis Olson (USA)
Theodore Farwell (USA)
Gladys Werner (USA)
Catherine Rudolph (USA)
Clarence Servold (Canada)

1960 Squaw Valley, California, USA

John R. Cress (USA)
Craig M. Lussi (USA)
Alfred L. Vincelette (USA)
Theodore A. Farwell (USA)
Charles T. Ferries (USA)
Ansten Samuelstuen (USA)
Max S. Marolt (USA)
Willy Schaeffler, Coach (USA)
Clarence L. Servold (Canada)

1964 Innsbruck, Austria

Charles T. Ferries (USA)
Richard G. “Rip” McManus (USA)
James E. Shea (USA)
Asten Samuelstuen (USA)
Jon Terje Øverland (Norway)

1968 Grenoble, France

Fred S. Chaffee II (USA)
Georg R. Krog (USA)
Dennis M. McCoy (USA)
Otto Tschudi (Norway)
Mike A. Devecka (USA)
Jon Terje Øverland Norway
Charles T. Ferries, Coach USA

1972 Sapporo, Japan

Fred S. Chaffee II (USA)
Eric J. Poulsen (USA)
Otto Tschudi (Norway)
Reuben T. Palmer (USA)
Terry J. Palmer (USA)
Mike A. Devecka (USA)
Willy Schaeffler, Coach USA
Paul D. Rachetto, Coach USA
James E. Shea, Coach USA

1976 Innsbruck, Austria

Odd Hammernes (Norway)
Mike A. Devecka (USA)
Robert F. Kiesel, Coach USA

1980 Lake Placid, N.Y.

Mike A. Devecka (USA)
Robert F. Kiesel, Coach USA
Dave Durrance, Coach USA

1984 Sarajevo, Yugoslavia

John McMurtry, Coach USA

1994 Lillehammer, Norway

Jeanette Lunde (Norway)

1998 Nagano, Japan

Andrzej Bachleda (Poland)
Sophie Ormond (Great Britain)

2002 Salt Lake City, Utah

Andrzej Bachleda (Poland)

2010 – Vancouver, Canada

Leif Kristian Haugen (Norway)

2014 – Sochi, Russia

Leif Kristian Haugen (Norway)
Sebastian Brigovic (Croatia)
Trevor Philp (Canada)
Andrea Komsic (Croatia)

2018 – PyeongChang, South Korea

Leif Kristian Haugen (Norway) Bronze Medal
Erik Read (Canada)
Trevor Philp (Canada)
Andrea Komsic (Croatia)

See also
List of NCAA schools with the most NCAA Division I championships

References